Dhabouli is a village located in Saharsa district of Bihar state, India.The total geographical area of village is 2555.92 hectares. Madhepura is nearest town to Dhabauli which is approximately 10km away. The primary occupation is farming, but now many people have migrated to places like Delhi and Mumbai for work. A number of people of this village are also working in offices of the state, central governments of India and Private sector. More than 25000 people have been living here since the origin of this area. The village has three panchayats and a population of more than 25,000. The village has good telecom connectivity. The village has also a branch of State Bank of India.

Administration
There are three panchayats in Dhabouli 
 Dhabouli (South)
 Dhabouli (East) 
 Dhabouli (West) Mauni Gram Kahra is also a part of this Panchayat.

This village comes under the Patarghat Block and OP. It comes under Sourbajar sub-division and [Saharsa] District. It comes under [Sonbarsha, Saharsa in Bihar (Vidhan Sabha constituency)].

Education
There is a 10+2 level Senior Secondary School, seven Middle Schools and four Primary Schools.

Transportation
Dhabouli has connectivity by road and rail transport from Madhepura and Saharsa.  
 Connectivity of Dhabauli

Villages in Saharsa district